Mark Roche (born 25 January 1993) is an Irish rugby union player. He plays for the Ireland national rugby sevens team as a scrum-half.

Youth rugby and early career
In his youth, Roche played with Blackrock. He then went on to play for the Ireland under-20 national team in the 2013 IRB Junior World Championship. He was also part of the Lansdowne team that was crowned 2015 All-Ireland League Division 1A champions, scoring a try in the final against Clontarf.

Ireland national sevens team
Roche has played as a scrum-half for the Ireland national rugby sevens team since 2015. 
Roche played for Ireland in the 2017 Rugby Europe Grand Prix, helping Ireland qualify for the 2018 Hong Kong qualifier and the 2018 Rugby World Cup Sevens.

Roche was part of the Ireland team that reached the semifinals of the 2018 Hong Kong Sevens qualifier for the 2018–19 World Rugby Sevens Series. He started at scrum-half for the Ireland team that finished third at the 2018 London Sevens; Roche was selected to the tournament Dream Team at the conclusion of the tournament. He competed for Ireland at the 2022 Rugby World Cup Sevens in Cape Town.

References

External links 
 Mark Roche at Irish Rugby Football Union

1993 births
Living people
Irish rugby union players
Ireland international rugby sevens players
Olympic rugby sevens players of Ireland
Rugby sevens players at the 2020 Summer Olympics